Saints Jonas and Barachisius (died 327), two brothers, were Persian martyrs during the persecutions of King Shapur II.

Life

L. M Pétin in his  Dictionnaire hagiographique (1850) says that Barachisius and his brother Jonas were from the town of Beth-Asa in Persia.
When Shapur II started his persecution of the Christians in 327, they went to Hubaham to encourage the martyrs and were arrested in turn.
The judge demanded that they renounce their faith but they refused, despite extreme tortures, and died on 24 December 327. 
Their feast day is 29 March.

Monks of Ramsgate account

The monks of St Augustine's Abbey, Ramsgate wrote in their Book of Saints (1921),

Butler's account

The hagiographer Alban Butler (1710–1773) wrote in his Lives of the Fathers, Martyrs, and Other Principal Saints under May 26,

See also

 Martyrs of Persia under Shapur II

Notes

Sources

 

 

Persian saints
327 deaths